Ravenia swartziana is a species of flowering plant in the citrus family, Rutaceae. It is endemic to Jamaica, where it is known only from the type specimen collected early in the 20th century.

References

Ravenia (plant)
Endemic flora of Jamaica
Critically endangered plants
Taxonomy articles created by Polbot